The Wu languages (Wu romanization and IPA: wu6 gniu6 [] (Shanghainese), ng2 gniu6 [] (Suzhounese), Mandarin pinyin and IPA: Wúyǔ []) is a major group of Sinitic languages spoken primarily in Shanghai, Zhejiang Province, and the part of Jiangsu Province south of the Yangtze River, which makes up the cultural region of Wu. The Suzhou dialect was the prestige dialect of Wu as of the 19th century, and formed the basis of Wu's koiné dialect, Shanghainese, at the turn of the 20th century. Speakers of various Wu languages sometimes inaccurately labelled their mother tongue as "Shanghainese" when introduced to foreigners. The languages of Northern Wu are mutually intelligible with each other, while those of Southern Wu are not.

Historical linguists view Wu of great significance because it distinguished  itself from other varieties of Chinese by preserving the voiced initials of the ancient Middle Chinese and by preserving the checked tone as a glottal stop. Wu and the Suzhou dialect in particular is perceived as soft in the ears of Mandarin speakers; hence there is the idiom "the tender speech of Wu".

The decline of Wu began from around 1986, when students were banned from speaking "uncivilized dialects" during class, a term used by the State Language Commission to refer to all Chinese languages other than Standard Chinese.  In 1992, students in Shanghai were banned from speaking Wu at all times on campuses. Since the late 2000s, Wu mostly survived in kitchens and theatres, as a "kitchen language" among the elderly housewives and as a theatrical language in folk Yue opera, Shanghai opera and Pingtan. As of now, Wu has no official status, no legal protection and there is no officially sanctioned romanization.

Names
Speakers of Wu varieties are mostly unaware of this term for their speech, since the term "Wu" is a relatively recent classificatory imposition on what are less clearly defined and highly heterogeneous natural forms. Saying someone "speaks Wu" is therefore akin to saying someone "speaks a Romance language"; it is not a particularly defined entity like Standard Mandarin or  Hochdeutsch.

Most speakers are only vaguely aware of their local variety's affinities with other similarly classified varieties, and will generally only refer to their local Wu variety rather than to the dialect family as a whole. This is typically done by affixing "" ("speech") to a location's endonym. For example,  is used for Wenzhounese.

 Wu (Wuxinese: , 'Wu language'): the formal name and standard reference in dialectology literature.
 Wuyue language ("the language of Wu-Yue"): a poetic and historical name in the modern sense, highlighting the roots of the language to the ancient states and hence the culture of Wu and Yue during the Warring States period.
 Goetian, derived from the Japanese spelling of Wuyue (Gō-etsu), is among the alternative names listed by Ethnologue.
 The Wu topolect, a derogatory and self-deprecating yet common name that belittles the status of Wu languages as a "dialect" of "the [one] Chinese language", usually used by academics in state-administered universities.
 Jiang–Zhe speech: a non-standard name meaning "the speech of Jiangsu and Zhejiang", occasionally used to highlight the fact that the language is spoken in two provinces.
 Jiangnan speech: a non-standard and uncommon name that links the language to the cultural region of Jiangnan ("south of the Yangtze River"). This is not to be confused with the Jiangnan Industrial Groups Koine, spoken in Xiangtan, which is classified as Mandarin.

History
Wu Chinese is the most ancient of the six major southern Chinese varieties, tracing its origin to more than 3,000 years ago, when the Zhou princes Taibo and Zhongyong migrated from the Guanzhong region in modern Shaanxi to the Wuxi–Suzhou area of the Jiangnan region, where they established the state of Wu. The northern language they brought formed the foundation of Wu Chinese. By the Six Dynasties era, Wu had already been developing for a millennium and differed considerably from the northern speech. When large numbers of northern Chinese migrated to Jiangnan following the fall of the Western Jin dynasty, they discovered great discrepancies between the two varieties of Chinese. This is recorded in contemporary texts such as the Shi Shuo Xin Yu. The Japanese  readings of Chinese characters (obtained from the Eastern Wu during the Three Kingdoms period) are from the ancient Wu Chinese of this period. However, as Wu Chinese has been under strong influence from the north throughout history, many of its ancient features have been lost. The language of today is largely descendant from the Middle Chinese of the Sui–Tang era (6–8th centuries), as is true of most contemporary Chinese languages, with Min Chinese languages being notable exceptions. However, many of the ancient Wu features have been preserved in Min, as the latter began its life as the Old Wu spoken by migrants to Fujian during the century that marked the transition from the late Han dynasty to the Three Kingdoms and the Western Jin.

Substrate influences
Wu is considered the most ancient southern Chinese variety, since the Jiangnan region was the first area settled that was non-contiguous with the northern Chinese states. Proto-Min or Old Wu–Min is also the language from which the Min dialects evolved as the populace migrated farther south, so some knowledge of this language would not only offer insight into the development of these dialects and Sino-Tibetan but also into the indigenous languages of the region, knowledge of which would also be invaluable towards establishing the phylogeny of related Asian languages and towards reconstructing them.

According to traditional history, Taibo of Wu settled in the area during the Shang dynasty, bringing along a large section of the population and Chinese administrative practices to form the state of Wu. The state of Wu might have been ruled by a Chinese minority along with sinified Yue peoples, and the bulk of the population would have remained Yue until later migrations and absorption into the greater Chinese populace (though many likely fled south as well). Many have wondered about what effect the Yue people's language may have had on the dialect spoken there, since, for example, names and other social practices in the state of Yue are markedly different from the rest of Chinese civilization.

Bernhard Karlgren, on the other hand, noted that the Tang koiné was adopted by most speakers in China (except for those in Fujian) with only slight remnants of "vulgar" speech from pre-Tang times, which he believed were preserved among the lower classes, albeit this makes many presumptions about Tang China's class structure and sociolinguistic situation. Most linguists today refer to these remnants as dialectal strata or substrata. In many ways, the koiné can be considered the language from which Wu varieties evolved, with the earlier language leaving behind a pre-Tang dialectal stratum which itself may have included a substratum from the Yue language(s).

Western dialectologists have found a small handful of words that appear to be part of an Austroasiatic substratum in many Wu and Min languages. Mandarin Chinese also possesses some words of Austroasiatic origin, such as the original name of the Yangtze River, "" (jiāng; Old Chinese *krung, compared to Old Vietnamese *krong), which has evolved into the general word for "river". Min languages, which were less affected by the koiné, definitely appear to possess an Austroasiatic substratum, such as a Min word for shaman or spirit healer such as in Jian'ou Min  toŋ³ which appears to be cognate with Vietnamese ʔdoŋ², Written Mon doŋ, and Santali dōŋ, which all have meanings similar to the Min word. However, Laurent Sagart points out that the resemblance between the Min word for shaman or spirit healer and the Vietnamese term with the same meaning is likely coincidental.

Min languages notably retain the bilabial nasal coda for this word.

Li Hui identifies 126 Tai-Kadai cognates in Maqiao Wu dialect spoken in the suburbs of Shanghai out of more than a thousand lexical items surveyed. According to the author, these cognates are likely traces of "old Yue language".

Analysis of the Song of the Yue Boatman, a song in the Yue language transcribed by a Chinese official in Chinese characters, clearly points to a Tai language rather than an Austroasiatic one. Chinese discussion of Wenzhounese often mentions the strong Tai affinities the dialect possesses. The Zhuang languages in Guangxi and western Guangdong, for example, are also Tai, so it would appear that Tai populated southern China before the Chinese expansion. The term Yue was clearly applied indiscriminately to any non-Chinese in the area that the Chinese encountered. The impact of these languages still appears to be fairly minimal overall.

Though Sino-Tibetan, Tai–Kadai, Austronesian and Austroasiatic are mostly considered to be unrelated to each other, Laurent Sagart has proposed some possible phylogenetic affinities. Specifically, Tai–Kadai and Sino-Tibetan could possibly both belong to the Sino-Austronesian language family (not to be confused with Austroasiatic) due to a scattering of cognates between their ancestral forms, and there is also some, albeit much more tenuous, evidence to suggest that Austroasiatic should also be included, however his views are but one among competing hypotheses about the phylogeny of these languages, see the Sino-Austronesian languages article for some further detail. During the 8th and 9th centuries, ethnic Koreans from Silla made overseas communities in the Wu speaking region.

It does appear that Wu varieties have had non-Sinitic influences, and many contain words cognate with those of other languages in various strata. These words however are few and far between, and Wu on the whole is most strongly influenced by Tang Chinese rather than any other linguistic influence.

Migrations
As early as the time of Guo Pu (276–324), speakers easily perceived differences between dialects in different parts of China including the area where Wu varieties are spoken today.

According to records of the Eastern Jin, the earliest known dialect of Nanjing was an ancient Wu dialect. After the Wu Hu uprising and the Disaster of Yongjia in 311, the Jin Emperor and many northern Chinese fled south, establishing the new capital Jiankang in what is modern-day Nanjing.
The lower Yangtze region became heavily inundated by settlers from Northern China, mostly coming from what is now northern Jiangsu province and Shandong province, with smaller numbers of settlers coming from the Central Plains. From the 4th to the 5th century, Northern people moved into Wu areas, adding characteristics to the lexicon of Northern Wu, traces of which can still be found in Northern Wu varieties today.

One prominent historical speaker of the Wu dialect was Emperor Yangdi of the Sui dynasty and his Empress Xiao. Emperor Xuan of Western Liang, a member of Emperor Wu of Liang's court, was Empress Xiao's grandfather and he most likely learned the Wu dialect at Jiankang.

After the Taiping Rebellion at the end of the Qing dynasty, in which the Wu-speaking region was devastated by war, Shanghai was inundated with migrants from other parts of the Wu-speaking area. This greatly affected the variety of Shanghai, bringing, for example, influence from the Ningbo dialect to a dialect which, at least within the walled city of Shanghai, was almost identical to the Suzhou dialect. As a result of the population boom, in the first half of the 20th century, Shanghainese became almost a lingua franca within the region, eclipsing the status of the Suzhou variety. However, due to its pastiche of features from different languages, it is rarely used to infer historical information about the Wu group and is less representative of Wu than the Suzhou variety.

Written sources
There are few written sources of study for Wu, and research is generally concentrated on modern speech forms rather than texts. Written Chinese has always been in the classical form, so Wu speakers would have written in this classical form and read it in a literary form of their dialect based on the phonetic distinctions outlined in rhyme dictionaries. Therefore, no text in classical Chinese from the region would give a clear notion about the actual speech of the writer, although there may have been cleverly disguised puns based on local pronunciations that are lost on modern readers or other dialect speakers. Yue opera, for example, is performed in the Shaoxing dialect, however the register is more literary than oral.

There are still a number of primary documents available, but they do not always give a clear sense of the dialects' historical pronunciation. They do often offer insight into lexical differences. Most of the sources for diachronic Wu study lie in the folk literature of the region. Since the average person was illiterate and the literate were often traditionalists who possibly perceived their local form of Chinese as a degenerated version of a classical ideal, very little was recorded, although local vocabulary often sneaks into written records.

A "ballad–narrative" known as "The Story of Xue Rengui Crossing the Sea and Pacifying Liao", which is about the Tang dynasty hero Xue Rengui, is believed to have been written in the Suzhou dialect of Wu.

The main sources of study are from the Ming and Qing period, since the dialectal differences were not as obvious until Ming times, and lie in historical folk songs, tanci (a kind of ballad or lyric poem), local records, legendary stories, baihua novels, educational material produced for the region, notes which have survived among individuals' effects, the linguistic descriptions made by foreigners (primarily by missionaries), and the Bibles translated into Wu dialects. These all give glimpses into the past, but except for the bibles, are not so useful for phonological studies. They are, however, of tremendous importance for diachronic studies of vocabulary and to a lesser extent grammar and syntax.

The diachronic study of written Ming and Qing Wu, the time when the dialects began to take on wholly unique features, can be placed into three stages: the Early Period, the Middle Period, and the Late Period.

The "Early Period" begins at the end of the Ming dynasty to the beginning of the Qing in the 17th century, when the first documents showing distinctly Wu characteristics appear. The representative work from this period is the collection of folk songs gathered by Feng Menglong entitled "Shan Ge" . The majority of early period documents record the Wu varieties of southern Jiangsu and northern Zhejiang, so any discussion in this section is primarily relevant to Northern Wu or the Taihu division. Along with some other legends and works, the following list contains many of the documents that are either written in Wu or contain parts where dialects are used.

 San Yan , a trilogy of collected stories compiled by Feng Menglong
 Er Pai , two short story collections by Ling Mengchu
 Xing Shi Yan , a novella recorded by Lu Renlong 
 Huan Sha Ji , an opera by Liang Chenyu 
 Mo Hanzhai dingben chuanqi , Feng Menglong
 Qing zhong pu 
 Doupeng xianhua , early Qing baihua novel
 Guzhang jue chen , late Ming novel collection
 Bo zhong lian 

These works contain a small handful of unique grammatical features, some of which are not found in contemporary Mandarin, classical Chinese, or in contemporary Wu varieties. They do contain many of the unique features present in contemporary Wu such as pronouns, but clearly indicate that not all of the earlier unique features of these Wu dialects were carried into the present. These works also possess a number of characters uniquely formed to express features not found in the classical language and used some common characters as phonetic loans (see Chinese character classification) to express other uniquely Wu vocabulary.

During the Ming dynasty, Wu speakers moved into Jianghuai Mandarin speaking regions, influencing the Tairu and Tongtai dialects of Jianghuai. During the time between the Ming Dynasty and early Republican era, the main characteristics of modern Wu were formed. The Suzhou dialect became the most influential, and many dialectologists use it in citing examples of Wu.

The Middle Period took place in the middle of the Qing dynasty in the 18th century. Many of the common phenomena found in the Shan Ge are not present in works from this period, but we see the production of many new words and new means of using words.

The Late Period is the period from late Qing to Republican China, in the 19th and 20th centuries. The representative works from this period are Wu vernacular novels ( or ) such as The Sing-song Girls of Shanghai and The Nine-tailed Turtle. Other works include:

 Haitian Hongxue Ji 
 The Nine-tailed Fox 
 Officialdom Unmasked 
 Wuge Jiaji 
 He Dian 

Wu-speaking writers who wrote in vernacular Mandarin often left traces of their native varieties in their works, as can be found in Guanchang Xianxing Ji and Fubao Zatan.

Another source from this period is from the work of the missionary Joseph Edkins, who gathered large amounts of data and published several educational works on Shanghainese as well as a Bible in Shanghainese and a few other major Wu varieties.

Works in this period also saw an explosion of new vocabulary in Wu dialects to describe their changing world. This clearly reflects the great social changes which were occurring during the time.

There are currently three works available on the topic:
  (Ming and Qing Wu and Modern Dialect Research) by Shi Rujie
  (Studies of Wu words found in Ming and Qing literature) by Chu Bannong
  (Dictionary of Ming and Qing Wu) edited by Shi Rujie

Post-1949

After the founding of the People's Republic of China, the strong promotion of Mandarin in the Wu-speaking region yet again influenced the development of Wu Chinese. Wu was gradually excluded from most modern media and schools. Public organizations were required to use Mandarin. With the influx of a migrant non-Wu-speaking population, the near total conversion of public media and organizations to the exclusive use of Mandarin as well as radical Mandarin promotion measures, the modernization and standardization of or literacy in Wu languages became improbable and left them more prone to Mandarinization. The promotion measures, which at present mostly consist of signs like the one pictured, are primarily aimed at limiting the usage of local dialects in conducting public or administrative affairs, although it, like the smoking ban, is commonly violated and it is not so uncommon to hear people speaking local dialects in a government office or a bank. The usage of local dialects in all other spheres is officially tolerated. Standardization of dialects, however, may be perceived as a precursor to possible regionalism, so this, too, would most likely be deterred. On the other hand, few speakers consider their dialect important enough to be written or standardized. To most speakers, dialects are in essence a wholly oral phenomenon.

It is not uncommon to encounter children who grew up with a regional variant of Mandarin as their parent tongue with little or no fluency in a Wu variety at all. However, this is primarily when parents are speakers of different languages and communicate in Mandarin and more rarely due to the parents' attitudes towards using language or dialect, which most associate with the warmth of home and family life. Many people have noticed this trend and thus call for the preservation and documentation of not only Wu but all Chinese varieties. The first major attempt was the Linguistic Atlas of Chinese Dialects, which surveyed 2,791 locations across the nation, including 121 Wu locations (a step up from the two locations in PKU's earlier surveys), and led to the formation of an elaborate database including digital recordings of all locations; however, this database is not available to the general public. The atlas's editor, Cao Zhiyun, considers many of these languages "endangered" and has introduced the term  (languages in danger) or "endangered dialects" into the Chinese language to raise people's attention to the issue, while others try to draw attention to how the dialects fall under the scope of UNESCO's intangible cultural heritage and as such deserve to be preserved and respected.

More TV programs are appearing in Wu varieties and nearly every city/town has at least one show in their native variety. However, they are no longer permitted to air during primetime. They are generally more playful than serious and the majority of these shows, such as Hangzhou's  "Old Liutou tells you the news", provide local or regional news in the dialect, but most are limited to fifteen minutes of airtime. Popular video sites such as Youku and Tudou also host a variety of user-uploaded audio and visual media in many Wu languages and dialects, most of which are dialectal TV shows, although some are user-created songs and the like. A number of popular books are also appearing to teach people how to speak the Shanghainese, Suzhou dialect and Wenzhounese but they are more playful and entertaining than serious attempts at promoting literacy or standardization.

Jianghuai Mandarin has replaced Wu as the language of multiple counties in Jiangsu. An example of this is Zaicheng Town in Lishui County; both Jianghuai and Wu languages were spoken in several towns in Lishui, with Wu being spoken by more people in more towns than Jianghuai. The Wu dialect is called "old Zaicheng Speech", while the Jianghuai dialect is called "new Zaicheng speech", with Wu languages being driven rapidly to extinction. Only  use it to talk to relatives. The Jianghuai dialect has been present there for about a century, even though all of the surrounding are Wu speaking. Jianghuai was always confined inside the town itself until the 1960s; at present, it is overtaking Wu.

Number of speakers
Wu Chinese was once historically dominant north of the Yangtze River and most of what is now Anhui province during the Sui dynasty. Its strength in areas north of the Yangtze vastly declined from the late Tang dynasty until the late Ming dynasty, when the first characteristics of Early Modern Wu were formed. During the early Qing period, Wu speakers represented about 20% of the whole Chinese population. This percentage drastically declined after the Taiping Rebellion devastated the Wu-speaking region, and it was reduced to about 8% by 1984, when the total number of speakers was estimated to be 80 million.

Classification
Wu's place within the greater scope of Sinitic varieties is less easily typified than prototypically northern Chinese varieties such as Mandarin or prototypically southern Chinese varieties such as Cantonese. Its original classification, along with the other Sinitic varieties, was established in 1937 by Li Fang-Kuei, whose boundaries more or less have remained the same and were adopted by Yuan Jiahua in his influential 1961 dialect primer.

The sole basis of Li's classification was the evolution of Middle Chinese voiced stops. In the original sense, a Wu variety was by definition one which retained voiced initials. This definition is problematic considering the devoicing process which has begun in many southern Wu varieties that are surrounded by dialects which retain the ancestral voicing. The loss of voicing in a dialect does not entail that its other features will suddenly become dramatically different from the dialects it has had long historic ties with. It furthermore would place Old Xiang in this category. Therefore, more elaborate systems have developed, but they still mostly delineate the same regions. Regardless of the justification, the Wu region has been clearly outlined, and Li's boundary in some ways has remained the de facto standard.

In Jerry Norman's usage, Wu dialects can be considered "central dialects" or dialects that are clearly in a transition zone containing features that typify both northern and southern Chinese varieties.

Possible Kra–Dai substratum
Li Hui (2001) finds possible 126 Kra-Dai cognates in the Maqiao Wu dialect spoken in the suburbs of Shanghai, out of more than 1,000 lexical items surveyed. According to the author, these cognates are likely traces of the "Old Yue language" (gu Yueyu). The two tables below show lexical comparisons between the Maqiao Wu dialect and Kra-Dai languages as quoted from Li Hui (2001). He notes that, in Wu Chinese, final consonants such as -m, -ɯ, -i, ụ, etc do not exist, and therefore, -m in the Maqiao dialect tends to become -ŋ, -n, or zero. In some cases, -m even becomes a final glottal stop.

Languages and dialects

Wu languages are spoken in most of Zhejiang province, the whole municipality of Shanghai, southern Jiangsu province, as well as smaller parts of Anhui and Jiangxi provinces. Many are located in the lower Yangtze valley.

Dialectologists traditionally establish linguistic boundaries based on several overlapping isoglosses of linguistic features. One of the critical historical factors for these boundaries lies in the movement of the population of speakers. This is often determined by the administrative boundaries established during imperial times. As such, imperial boundaries are essential for delineating one variety from another, and many varieties' isogloss clusters line up perfectly with the county boundaries established in imperial times, although some counties contain more than one variety and others may span several counties. Another factor that influences movement and transportation as well as the establishment of administrative boundaries is geography. Northernmost Zhejiang and Jiangsu are very flat, in the middle of a river delta, and as such are more uniform than the more mountainous regions farther south towards Fujian. The Taihu varieties, like Mandarin in the flat northern plains, are more homogeneous than Southern Wu, which has a significantly greater diversity of linguistic forms, and this is likely a direct result of geography. Coastal varieties also share more featural affinities, likely because the East China Sea provides a means of transportation. The same phenomenon can be seen with Min varieties.

Major groupings
Wu is divided into two major groups: Northern Wu and Southern Wu, which are only partially mutually intelligible. Individual words spoken in isolation may be comprehensible among these speakers, but the flowing discourse of everyday life mostly is not. There is another lesser group, Western Wu, synonymous with the Xuanzhou division, which has a larger influence from the surrounding Mandarin varieties than Northern Wu, making it typologically much different from the rest of Wu.

Southern Wu is well known among linguists and sinologists as being one of the most internally diverse among the Sinitic groups, with very little mutual intelligibility between varieties across subgroups. On the other hand, some Wu varieties like Wenzhounese have gained notoriety for their high incomprehensibility to both Wu and non-Wu speakers alike, so much so that Wenzhounese was used during the Second World War to avoid Japanese interception.

In the Language Atlas of China (1987), Wu was divided into six subgroups:

Taihu (i.e., Lake Tai region): Spoken over much of southern Jiangsu province, including Suzhou, Wuxi, Changzhou, the southern part of Nantong, Jingjiang, and Danyang; the city of Shanghai; and the northern part of Zhejiang province, including Ningbo, Hangzhou, Huzhou, Shaoxing and Jiaxing. This group makes up the largest population among all Wu speakers. The local varieties of this region are mostly mutually intelligible among each other.
Shanghainese
Suzhou dialect
Ningbo dialect
Hangzhou dialect
Huzhou dialect
Wuxi dialect
Changzhou dialect
Jiangyin dialect
Qi–Hai dialect
Jinxiang dialect
Taizhou （）: Spoken in and around Taizhou, Zhejiang province. Taizhou Wu is among the southern varieties that are the closest to Taihu Wu, also known as North Wu, and speakers can communicate with speakers of Taihu Wu.
Taizhou dialect
Oujiang/Dong'ou (/): Spoken in and around the city of Wenzhou, Zhejiang province. This variety is the most distinctive and mutually unintelligible amongst all the Wu varieties.
Wenzhounese
Yueqing dialect
Wuzhou: Spoken in and around Jinhua, Zhejiang province. Like Taizhou Wu, it is somewhat mutually intelligible with Taihu Wu.
Chu–Qu （）: Spoken in and around Lishui and Quzhou in Zhejiang as well as in Shangrao County and Yushan County in Jiangxi province.
Quzhou dialect
Jiangshan dialect
Qingtian dialect
Xuanzhou （）: Spoken in and around Xuancheng, Anhui province. This part of Wu is becoming less spoken since the campaign started by the Taiping Rebellion, and it is being slowly replaced by the immigrant Mandarin from north of the Yangtse river.

Southern Wu
Chinese dialectologist Cao Zhiyun has rearranged some of the divisions based on a larger corpus of data.
According to Cao, Southern Wu can be divided into three broad divisions (note that he is using the pre-republican boundaries for the cited locations):
 Jin–Qu, which contains twelve locations.
Jinhua Prefecture: Jinhua, Tangxi, Lanxi, Pujiang, Yiwu, Dongyang, Pan'an, Yongkang, and Wuyi
Quzhou Prefecture: Quzhou and Longyou
Lishui Prefecture: Jinyun
 Shang–Li, which contains seventeen locations and has two subdivisions:
Shang–Shan, which contains six locations.
Shangrao prefecture, Jiangxi province: Shangrao, Guangfeng, Yushan
Quzhou prefecture: Kaihua, Changshan, Jiangshan
Lishui, which contains eleven locations.
Lishui Prefecture: Lishui, Suichang, Songyang,  (former county of Lishui, now belonging to Wuyi), Qingtian, Yunhe, Jingning She Autonomous County, Longquan, and Qingyuan
Wenzhou Prefecture: Taishun county
Nanping Prefecture in Fujian: Pucheng
 Oujiang or Ou River, which contains eight locations.
Wenzhou prefecture: Wenzhou, Yongjia, Yueqing, Rui'an, Dongtou, Pingyang, Cangnan, and Wencheng (excluding the Min speaking regions of Pingyang and Cangnan).

Phonology
The Wu dialects are notable among Chinese varieties in having kept the "muddy" (voiced; whispery voiced word-initially) plosives and fricatives of Middle Chinese, such as  etc., thus maintaining the three-way contrast of Middle Chinese stop consonants and affricates, etc. (For example, 「凍 痛 洞」 , where other varieties have only .) Because Wu dialects never lost these voiced obstruents, the tone split of Middle Chinese may still be allophonic, and most dialects have three syllabic tones (though counted as eight in traditional descriptions). In Urban Shanghainese, some more tones have undergone merging, and thus can be analysed to only have two phonemic tones.

Wu varieties and Germanic languages have the largest vowel quality inventories in the world.  The Jinhui dialect spoken in Shanghai's Fengxian District has 20 vowel qualities. Because of these different changes within Wu, which gives it its unique quality, it has also sometimes been called the "French of China".

Grammar
The pronoun systems of many Wu dialects are complex when it comes to personal and demonstrative pronouns. For example, Wu exhibits clusivity (having different forms of the first-person plural pronoun depending on whether or not the addressee is included). Wu employs six demonstratives, three of which are used to refer to close objects, and three of which are used for farther objects.

In terms of word order, Wu uses SVO (like Mandarin), but unlike Mandarin, it also has a high occurrence of SOV and in some cases OSV.

In terms of phonology, tone sandhi is extremely complex, and helps parse multisyllabic words and idiomatic phrases. In some cases, indirect objects are distinguished from direct objects by a voiced/voiceless distinction.

In most cases, classifiers take the place of genitive particles and articles – a quality shared with Cantonese – as shown by the following examples:

Plural pronouns
Wu dialects vary in the way they pluralize pronouns.

Classifiers
All nouns could have just one classifier in Shanghainese.

Examples

Shanghainese

Suzhounese

Romanization

There are three major schools of romanization of Wu Chinese.

Vocabulary
Like other varieties of Southern Chinese, Wu Chinese retains some archaic vocabulary from Classical Chinese, Middle Chinese, and Old Chinese. For instance, for "to speak" or "speaking", Wu dialects, with the exception of Hangzhou dialect, use góng, whereas Mandarin uses shuō. Furthermore, in Guangfeng and Yushan counties of Jiangxi province,  ( or yuē) is generally preferred over its Mandarin counterpart. In Shangrao county of Jiangxi province, Simplified Chinese:  Traditional Chinese:  pinyin: huà/ is preferred over the spoken Mandarin version of the word for "to speak" or "speaking". For Wu dialects closer to Fuzhou such as  Ningbonese,  Jinhuanese, and Wenzhounese the word nóng is used for "person" instead of rén/nin , similar to Min.

Pronouns

Examples

In Wu dialects, the morphology of the words are similar, but the characters are switched around. Not all Wu Chinese words exhibit this phenomenon, only some words in some dialects.

Colloquialisms
In Wu Chinese, there are colloquialisms that are traced back to ancestral Chinese varieties, such as Middle or Old Chinese. Many of those colloquialisms are cognates of other words found in other modern southern Chinese dialects, such as Gan, Xiang, or Min.

Mandarin equivalents and their pronunciation on Wu Chinese are in parentheses. All IPA transcriptions and examples listed below are from Shanghainese.
「鑊子」 (鍋子)  wok, cooking pot. The Mandarin equivalent term is also used, but both of them are synonyms and are thus interchangeable.
「衣裳」 (衣服)  clothing. Found in other Chinese dialects. It is a reference to traditional Han Chinese clothing, where it consists of the upper garments 「衣」 and the lower garments 「裳」.

Literature
The genres of kunqu opera and tanci song, appearing in the Ming Dynasty, were the first instances of the use of Wu dialect in literature. By the turn of the 20th century it was used in several novels that had prostitution as a subject. In many of these novels, Wu is mainly used as dialogue of prostitute characters. In one work, Shanghai Flowers by Han Bangqing, all of the dialogue is in Wu. Wu originally developed in genres related to oral performance. It was used in manners related to oral performance when it proliferated in written literature and it was widely used in fiction about prostitutes, a particular genre, and not in other genres. Donald B. Snow, author of Cantonese as Written Language: The Growth of a Written Chinese Vernacular, compared the development of Wu in this manner to the patterns of Baihua and Japanese vernacular writing.

Magnificent Dreams in Shanghai by Sun Jiazhen was another example of a prostitute novel with Wu dialogue from the turn of the 20th century.

Snow wrote that Wu literature "achieved a certain degree of prominence" by 1910. After 1910 there had been no novels which were as popular as The Nine-tailed Turtle or the critical acclaim garnered by Shanghai Flowers. In the popular fiction of the early 20th century the usage of Wu remained in use in prostitute dialogue but, as asserted by Snow, "apparently" did not extend beyond that. In 1926 Hu Shih stated that of all of the Chinese dialects, within literature, Wu had the brightest future. Snow concluded that instead Wu dialect writing became "a transient phenomenon that died out not long after its growth gathered steam."

Snow argued that the primary reason was the increase of prestige and importance in Baihua, and that one other contributing reason was changing market factors since Shanghai's publishing industry, which grew, served all of China and not just Shanghai. Duval argued that many Chinese critics had a low opinion of Wu works, mainly originating from the eroticism within them, and that contributed to the decline in Wu literature.

See also

 Romanization of Wu Chinese
 Huizhou Chinese
 
 Wo Bau-Sae
 Jiangnan
 List of varieties of Chinese
 Wu (region)
 Speakers of Wu Chinese
 Wuyue
 Wuyue culture

Notes

Further reading

References

Sources

 
 
 
 
 
 
 Snow, Donald B. Cantonese as Written Language: The Growth of a Written Chinese Vernacular. Hong Kong University Press, 2004.  . .

External links

Resources on Wu dialects
 Wugniu.com
 Wu Dictionary– Wu dictionary available in 8 dialects.
 Wu Character Pronunciation Shows how character(s) are pronounced in Wu, data available for many dialects.
 Wu Pronunciation Map How a character is pronounced in Wu depending on the region.
 glossika.com
 Shanghainese Wu Dictionary– Search in Mandarin, IPA, or 
 Classification of Wu Dialects – By James Campbell
 Tones in Wu Dialects – Compiled by James Campbell
 
A BBS set up in 2004, in which topics such as phonology, grammar, orthography and romanization of Wu Chinese are widely talked about.  The cultural and linguistic diversity within China is also a significant concerning of this forum.
 
A website aimed at modernization of Wu Chinese, including basics of Wu, Wu romanization scheme, pronunciation dictionaries of different dialects, Wu input method development, Wu research literatures, written Wu experiment, Wu orthography, a discussion forum etc.
 
Excellent references on Wu Chinese, including tones of the sub-dialects.
Tatoeba Project Tatoeba.org - Examples sentences in Shanghainese dialect, and in Suzhouan dialect.
Wu wordlist available through Kaipuleohone
Pronunciation dictionary - with audio from various Chinese cities.

Articles
 Globalization, National Culture and the Search for Identity: A Chinese Dilemma (1st Quarter of 2006, Media Development) – A comprehensive article, written by Wu Mei and Guo Zhenzhi of World Association for Christian Communication, related to the struggle for national cultural unity by current Chinese Communist national government while desperately fighting for preservation on Chinese regional cultures that have been the precious roots of all Han Chinese people (including Hangzhou Wu dialect). Excellent for anyone doing research on Chinese language linguistic, anthropology on Chinese culture, international business, foreign languages, global studies, and translation/interpretation.
 Modernisation a Threat to Dialects in China  – An excellent article originally from Straits Times Interactive through YTL Community website, it provides an insight of Chinese dialects, both major and minor, losing their speakers to Standard Mandarin due to greater mobility and interaction. Excellent for anyone doing research on Chinese language linguistic, anthropology on Chinese culture, international business, foreign languages, global studies, and translation/interpretation.
 Middlebury Expands Study Abroad Horizons – An excellent article including a section on future exchange programs in learning Chinese language in Hangzhou (plus colorful, positive impression on the Hangzhou dialect, too). Requires registration of online account before viewing.
 Mind your language (from The Standard, Hong Kong) – This newspaper article provides a deep insight on the danger of decline in the usage of dialects, including Wu dialects, other than the rising star of Standard Mandarin. It also mentions an exception where some grassroots' organizations and, sometimes, larger institutions, are the force behind the preservation of their dialects. Another excellent article for research on Chinese language linguistics, anthropology on Chinese culture, international business, foreign languages, global studies, and translation/interpretation.
 China: Dialect use on TV worries Beijing (originally from Straits Times Interactive, Singapore and posted on AsiaMedia Media News Daily from UCLA) – Article on the use of dialects other than standard Mandarin in China where strict media censorship is high.
 Standard or Local Chinese – TV Programs in Dialect (from Radio86.co.uk) – Another article on the use of dialects other than standard Mandarin in China.

 
Languages of China
Subject–verb–object languages
Varieties of Chinese